Paphangkorn "Patty" Tavatanakit (born 11 October 1999) is a Thai professional golfer who began competing on the LPGA Tour in January 2020. On 4 April 2021, Tavatanakit accomplished her first win on the LPGA Tour  the 2021 ANA Inspiration, a major championship in women's professional golf. In October 2021, Tavatanakit was named the Louise Suggs Rolex Rookie of the Year for the LPGA Tour in 2021.

Early life
Born in Bangkok, Thailand, she graduated from Keerapat International School, a high school in Bangkok.

Amateur career
She start playing golf during her teen years while at Keerapat International School, which had no golf team. In 2014, Tavatanakit won the Callaway Junior World Golf Championship for girls. She was named the 2015–2016 Thailand Amateur Ladies Golf Association Player of the Year, having won the Asian Junior Golf Association Rolex Tournament of Champions and Ping Invitational.

Over 2016–17, she played on the varsity golf team of the UCLA Bruins, winning seven collegiate tournaments. Tavatanakit was named the WGCA and Pac-12 Conference Freshman of the Year, WGCA First Team All-American twice, and All-Pac-12 First Team member. In 2018, she was the lowest scoring amateur at the U.S. Women's Open.

Professional career
Tavatanakit won three times in eight tournaments on the 2019 Symetra Tour, earning the Gaëlle Truet Rookie of the Year award.

Tavatanakit played her first tournament on the LPGA Tour at the Gainbridge LPGA at Boca Rio in January 2020, finishing in a tie for 35th; she competed in 14 LPGA events during 2020.

On 4 April 2021, she won her first LPGA tour event  the 2021 ANA Inspiration  a major LPGA championship.

Amateur wins
2013 TehBotol International Junior
2014 TrueVisions Singha Junior #3, TrueVisions International Junior Championship, LA Junior Open, TrueVisions Singha Junior #9
2015 LA Junior Open
2016 Rolex Tournament of Champions, The PING Invitational
2017 Stanford Intercollegiate
2018 Silverado Showdown, Pac-12 Championship, NCAA San Francisco Regional, ANNIKA Intercollegiate
2019 NCAA East Lansing Regional

Source:

Professional wins (4)

LPGA Tour wins (1)

Symetra Tour wins (3)

Major championships

Wins (1)

Results timeline
Results not in chronological order before 2019 or in 2020.

LA = low amateur
CUT = missed the half-way cut
NT = no tournament
T = tied

Summary

 Most consecutive cuts made – 5 (2021 ANA – 2022 Chevron)
 Longest streak of top-10s – 3 (2021 PGA – 2022 Chevron)

LPGA Tour career summary

^ Official as of 2022 season

World ranking
Position in Women's World Golf Rankings for each calendar year.

Team appearances 
Amateur
Patsy Hankins Trophy (representing Asia/Pacific): 2016 (winners), 2018 (winners)
Arnold Palmer Cup (representing the International team): 2018
Queen Sirikit Cup (representing Thailand): 2015, 2016

Awards
2021 Louise Suggs Rolex Rookie of the Year, LPGA Tour
2021 Rolex Annika Major Award
2019 Gaëlle Truet Rookie of the Year, Symetra Tour

References

External links

Patty Tavatanakit
LPGA Tour golfers
Winners of LPGA major golf championships
Patty Tavatanakit
Golfers at the 2020 Summer Olympics
Patty Tavatanakit
1999 births
Living people
Patty Tavatanakit